Cirith Gorgor is a Dutch black metal band that formed in 1993.

Discography

Studio releases
Onwards to the Spectral Defile (1999)
Unveiling the Essence (2001)
Firestorm Apocalypse – Tomorrow Shall Know the Blackest Dawn (2004)
Cirith Gorgor (2007)
Der Untergang... / Победа !!! (2011)
Visions of Exalted Lucifer (2016)
Sovereign (2019)

Demos and EPs
Mystic Legends... (demo, 1997)
Demonic Incarnation (promo, 2002)
Through Woods of Darkness and Evil (EP, 2002)
Split with Mor Dagor (EP, 2006)
Bi Den Dode Hant (EP, 2017)

Band members

Current
 Marchosias – guitar (1999–present)
 Valefor – guitar (2012–2020)
 Valtyr – bass (2012–present), guitar (2010–2012)
 Levithmong – drums (1996–present), vocals (2006)
 Satanael – vocals (2007–2009, 2013–2019)

Former
 Lord Mystic – bass guitar (1996–2012)
 Nimroth – vocals (1996–2006, 2009–2012)
 Asmoday – guitar (1996–1999)
 Astaroth Daemonum – guitar (1996–2001)
 Inferno – guitars (2002–2008)
 Odium – guitar (2008–2009)

Timeline

References

External links
 Cirith Gorgor web site

Dutch black metal musical groups
Musical groups established in 1993
Musical quintets
1993 establishments in the Netherlands